Rudra Shah (?–1673) was the king of the Gorkha Kingdom in the Indian subcontinent, present-day Nepal. He was the father of Prithvipati Shah.

References

Gurkhas
1673 deaths
People from Gorkha District
17th-century Nepalese people
Nepalese Hindus